The special envoys of the prime minister of Malaysia (Malay: Duta Khas Perdana Menteri Malaysia) are individuals, usually politicians, appointed with specific assignments to enhance the relationship between Malaysia with particular states or regions where Malaysia has considerable economic interests and cultural similarities. A contrast to that of ambassadorial appointments, Malaysian special envoys are not appointed by the Yang di-Pertuan Agong (King of Malaysia) as head of state, but rather direct appointees of the head of government, the prime minister of Malaysia. They are often appointed with the rank equivalent to a minister. Special envoys are often accorded a team consisting between four to eight personnel, usually including a senior private secretary, special officer, two special assistants and some with a police escort.

Although most special envoys have been appointed with ministerial rank, the salaries drawn have varied depending on portfolio. Known individuals who have served in this capacity without drawing any salary include Ong Ka Ting and Tiong King Sing during Tiong's first posting to East Asia. Nevertheless, Ong was listed as receiving a monthly salary of 20,000 during his earlier terms as special envoy.

List of special envoys of the prime ministers of Malaysia 

Colour key (for political coalition/parties):

Controversy 

The appointment of special envoys during the Barisan Nasional (BN) tenure was met with repeated accusations of unnecessary government expenditure due to the high salaries of these appointees. Concerns were also raised regarding the overlap in responsibilities and functions with respective ambassadors already in office(s). When the Pakatan Harapan (PH) coalition came to power, all previously appointed special envoys had their tenures cut short. Nonetheless, the PH eventually appointed a single special envoy, albeit without ministerial rank, when Tan Kok Wai was announced as special envoy to the People's Republic of China and concurrently as chairperson of the Malaysia-China Business Council (MCBC) in August 2018. The then-Malaysian Minister of Foreign Affairs, Saifuddin Abdullah, commented that the role of the special envoy would be to "complement" that of the ambassador in specialised areas.

Following the 2020–21 Malaysian political crisis, further controversy erupted when newly-appointed prime minister, Muhyiddin Yassin, was accused of appointing individuals as special envoys to secure his position.

See also 

 List of Ambassadors and High Commissioners of Malaysia
 List of diplomatic missions of Malaysia
 Foreign relations of Malaysia

References 

Malaysia diplomacy-related lists